Atticus: ...Dragging the Lake, Vol. 3 was the third in the series of compilation albums created by Atticus Clothing.

Track listing

References

2005 compilation albums